Natalie Gavin (born 1988) is an English actress from Bradford, known for her roles in the BBC dramas Prisoners' Wives and The Syndicate, and the ITV drama Jericho.

Early life 
Gavin was born in Bradford. She grew up in the Bradford neighbourhoods of Little Horton and Buttershaw, before moving to the Bradford neighbourhood and town of Denholme as a teenager. Gavin has a mum named Susan, a dad named John and brother named Shaun. John knew Andrea Dunbar as he worked and associated with her father. Gavin and her family lived on the same street that Andrea and her family did, which is named Brafferton Arbor, in Buttershaw. Gavin would later go on to play Andrea in the 2010 film The Arbor, which was filmed on the same street.

Education 
Gavin was educated at Buttershaw High School. She has a degree in drama from the University of Huddersfield in Huddersfield, West Yorkshire. She had to put her degree on hold for a few years, after being cast in Shameless during her second year of the course.

Career 
Gavin made her professional acting debut in two episodes of the Channel 4 comedy series Shameless, as Anna Sampson.

Gavin's first main film role was as The Girl in the 2010 film The Arbor, which dramatised the early life of Andrea Dunbar. Her first main TV role was as Lou in the BBC drama Prisoners' Wives, which she portrayed for six episodes. Later that year, she began appearing in the BBC medical drama Casualty, in the recurring role of Faith Portman.

In 2013, Gavin appeared in the second series of The Syndicate, a BBC drama, as Becky. In 2014, she starred in the British drama film The Knife That Killed Me. In 2016, Gavin appeared as Alma Capstick in the ITV drama Jericho.

In 2019, Gavin appeared in two BBC dramas; Gentleman Jack and Line of Duty, and portrayed the role of Nadine Murgatroyd in the Channel 4 school drama Ackley Bridge.

Personal life 
Gavin lives in the Bradford neighbourhood and town of Denholme, and previously lived in the Bradford neighbourhood of Clayton. Her favourite place is the Bradford village of Haworth.

Filmography

In 2020 she also narrated the bbc 2 series yorkshire firefighters.

References

External links
 

1988 births
Actresses from Bradford
Living people
English television actresses
English film actresses
Actors from Yorkshire